Seminole Tribe of Florida v. Florida, 517 U.S. 44 (1996), was a United States Supreme Court case which held that Article One of the U.S. Constitution did not give the United States Congress the power to abrogate the sovereign immunity of the states that is further protected under the Eleventh Amendment. Such abrogation is permitted where it is necessary to enforce the rights of citizens guaranteed under the Fourteenth Amendment as per Fitzpatrick v. Bitzer. The case also held that the doctrine of Ex parte Young, which allows state officials to be sued in their official capacity for prospective injunctive relief, was inapplicable under these circumstances, because any remedy was limited to the one that Congress had provided.

Background

Indian gaming history

The Seminole Tribe of Florida owned property in Fort Lauderdale, Florida, seven miles southwest of downtown, and in the late 1970s, built a large bingo facility on that land. As this was before the enactment of the Indian Gaming Regulatory Act, the tribe then sued the Broward County Sheriff in federal court to prevent him from enforcing state law on tribal land. The Southern District of Florida heard the case and issued a preliminary injunction in favor of the tribe in 1979 and a permanent injunction the following year. The sheriff appealed, and the Fifth Circuit affirmed the lower court's decision. 

That court decision opened the floodgates for Indian gaming, which had been shut down in 1949 by a decision in Wisconsin that Indians could not use slot machines or other gambling instruments on their reservations. Since bingo did not use those prohibited instruments, the tribes were free to open bingo halls. By 1983, about 180 bingo halls were being operated by tribes on reservations across the nation. This prompted a flood of litigation as the individual States attempted to shut down Indian gaming by either civil or criminal cases, efforts which typically failed, as in California.

As the various Indian tribes sought to obtain a steady source of revenue through gaming, some tribes went further than others. While abiding with the federal prohibition on gambling machines and instruments, the Puyallaup Indian tribe, on their reservation, opened casinos that offered blackjack, poker, and craps. Federal law enforcement authorities arrested the tribal members operating the casino and charged them with violating the Organized Crime Control Act. Similar results occurred in Michigan with the Lake Superior Band of Chippewa Indians.

Legislation

Beginning in 1984, Congress began to hold hearings on Indian gaming. Based on the Supreme Court decision in Cabazon that basically prohibited state regulation while allowing federal enforcement, Congress had to take some type of action. The Department of Justice (DOJ) took the position that it would be unable to prevent organized crime from being involved in Indian gaming operations. At the same time, the National Congress of American Indians (NCAI) called for preemptive legislation allowing tribal control and prohibiting state interference. States and non-tribal gaming interests opposed any tribal gaming.

In 1988 Congress passed the Indian Gaming Regulatory Act (IGRA). The final result was a compromise between the competing interests, and established three classes of gaming: Class I, traditional, low value gaming, often for ceremonial purposes; Class II, bingo and like games such as pull-tabs, and punchboards; and Class III, which included all other gaming, such as slot machines, craps, poker, and so on. Tribes are allowed to regulate all Class I/II Indian gaming, and the act set requirements for regulating Class III gaming, which was regulated by compacts between the tribes and the states, and overseen by the NIGC.

Many of the American Indian tribes were opposed to the legislation and the Mescalero Apache and Red Lake Band of Chippewa sued in an attempt to declare the law unconstitutional. The lawsuit was the first major attempt by an Indian Tribe to reverse the federal policy announced in Lone Wolf v. Hitchcock, which allowed Congress to exercise plenary power over the tribes, to include reneging on treaties. The attempt was unsuccessful, with the D.C. District Court holding that existing precedent allowed Congress to regulate actions of the tribes. 

The IGRA required the states to negotiate with Indian tribes to create compacts governing Indian gaming. The statute provided that if a state failed to enter into such negotiations, or to negotiate in good faith, the Tribes could sue the state in federal court in order to compel the states to negotiate. If the states still refused, the statute provided that the matter would ultimately be referred to the Secretary of the Interior. Congress had asserted its power under the part of the Commerce Clause relating to commerce with Indians to pass such a statute, abrogating the immunity of states pursuant to its express powers.

Case history

Facts of the case
The Seminole Tribe of Florida requested that the state enter into such a negotiation. When the state refused, the Tribe filed suit, as allowed by the statute, against both the state of Florida and the governor, Lawton Chiles. The District Court declined to dismiss the case, but the Eleventh Circuit reversed, holding that the Eleventh Amendment barred the suit, and that the doctrine of Ex parte Young could not be used to force good faith negotiation. The tribe then filed a petition for certiorari to the Supreme Court, which granted the petition and docketed the case. While Florida prepared to argue the case, thirty-one additional states filed amicus briefs supporting Florida's position.

A little less than two decades earlier, in Fitzpatrick v. Bitzer, the Court had held that Congress can abrogate state sovereign immunity pursuant to its powers under the Fourteenth Amendment, which clearly contemplates limiting the power of the states. In Pennsylvania v. Union Gas Co., the Court had held that Congress could also abrogate sovereign immunity under the Commerce Clause – but there was no majority in that decision. Justice Brennan was joined by three other justices in asserting that the Eleventh Amendment was nothing more than a reflection of common law sovereignty that could be swept aside by Congress; Justice Scalia was also joined by three other justices in taking the opposite view; and Justice Byron White wrote a separate opinion holding that Congress had such power, but stating his disagreement with Brennan's opinion (but not his own rationale).

Now, the Supreme Court was once again presented with the question of whether Congress has the power to abrogate the sovereign immunity of the states, pursuant to the powers granted to it in Article One.

Supreme Court

Arguments

Opinion of the Court

The Court, in an opinion by Chief Justice William Rehnquist, struck down this abrogation as unconstitutional and further held that the doctrine of Ex parte Young does not apply in this situation.

The Court began by repudiating the precedential value of Union Gas, noting that there was no single majority rationale, and characterizing it as a major departure from the 19th century case of Hans v. Louisiana, which had established the modern doctrine of sovereign immunity. The Court suggested that allowing Congress to abrogate sovereign immunity improperly expanded the jurisdiction of the federal courts beyond what Article Three of the U.S. Constitution permitted. The Eleventh Amendment, it contended, had further protected the states' sovereign immunity; the Fourteenth Amendment placed limitations on the Eleventh Amendment, but only with respect to the rights guaranteed in the Fourteenth Amendment.

The Court also found that the doctrine of Ex parte Young did not apply, invoking the rationale of an earlier case, Schweiker v. Chilicky, for the proposition that where Congress had provided a remedial scheme, the Courts would not imply the existence of additional remedies.

Dissenting Opinions
Justice Souter wrote a lengthy dissent in which he was joined by Justices Ginsburg and Breyer. Souter's dissent focuses on the language of the Eleventh Amendment, which only appears to eliminate diversity jurisdiction between states and citizens of other states. He rejects the "critical errors" in Hans, which had read common law sovereign immunity to extend the jurisdictional bar of the Eleventh Amendment to suits between states and their own citizens. Souter discounts the importance of the common law in interpreting the Constitution because the Constitution itself was such a new and unprecedented device at the time of its creation that it was clearly intended as a rejection of the common law that came before it. As support for this contention, Souter notes that the framers of the U.S. Constitution did not include language adopting the common law that had already been adopted by many of the states in their own constitutions. Souter also notes that Congress had rejected proposed language for the Eleventh Amendment which would clearly have barred suits between states and their own citizens, and which would clearly have prevented Congress from abrogating this bar.

Souter also disagrees with the Court's rejection of Ex parte Young, noting that where Chilicky was a rejection of the extra-statutory remedy proposed, Young was merely a jurisdictional device. Souter found it implausible that Congress would wish to see their statute made completely unenforceable simply because they had included a remedy for those injured by the failure of states to abide by it.

Justice Stevens dissented separately, agreeing with the points raised in Souter's dissent, but adding some additional observations. In particular, Stevens noted that neither Justice Iredell's dissent in Chisholm v. Georgia, nor the majority opinion in Hans had addressed situations in which Congress had specifically authorized a lawsuit against a state and suggested that both opinions had in fact presumed that such a suit was possible.

Subsequent developments
The decision in Seminole Tribe was described as having "exemplified the Court's increasingly adamant refusal to countenance the headlong expansion of Congress's regulatory power under the Constitution's Commerce Clause". In Alden v. Maine (1999), the Court clarified:

In Central Virginia Community College v. Katz (2006), the Court narrowed the scope of its ruling in Seminole Tribe v. Florida. It held the Bankruptcy Clause of Article I abrogated state sovereign immunity.

See also
 List of United States Supreme Court cases, volume 517
 List of United States Supreme Court cases
 Lists of United States Supreme Court cases by volume
 List of United States Supreme Court cases by the Rehnquist Court
 Copyright Remedy Clarification Act

Footnotes

References

External links
 

1996 in United States case law
United States Constitution Article One case law
United States Commerce Clause case law
United States Eleventh Amendment case law
United States Native American gaming case law
United States Supreme Court cases
United States Supreme Court cases of the Rehnquist Court
United States Supreme Court decisions that overrule a prior Supreme Court decision
Seminole Tribe of Florida
Casinos in Florida
1996 in Florida
Bingo
History of Fort Lauderdale, Florida